Chapar may refer to:
Chapar, Azerbaijan
Chapar, Dhubri, Assam, India
Chapar, West Azerbaijan, Iran
Chapar, Zanjan, Iran
Chapar, Pakistan
Chapar Khan, descendant of Genghis Khan, leader of the House of Ogedei